Balistes vetula, the queen triggerfish or old wife, is a reef dwelling triggerfish found in the Atlantic Ocean. It is occasionally caught as a gamefish, and sometimes kept in very large marine aquaria.

Etymology 
This fish is called cochino in Cuba, and this is the probable origin of the name Bahía de Cochinos, which is known as the Bay of Pigs in English.

Description 
The queen triggerfish reaches , though most only are about half that length. It is typically blue, purple, turquoise and green with a yellowish throat, and light blue lines on the fins and head. It can change colour somewhat to match its surroundings, or if subjected to stress.

Distribution 
In the western Atlantic, it ranges from Canada to southern Brazil, and in the eastern Atlantic it is found at Ascension, Cape Verde, Azores and south to Angola. It is reasonably common in Florida, the Bahamas and the Caribbean.

Ecology 

It preys on a variety of invertebrates, notably sea urchins.

In the aquarium 
As one of the largest and most aggressive of the triggerfish, this fish is rarely a good choice as a resident in a marine aquarium. It is however a hardy fish for those who can provide it with a proper environment. Because it grows so large and so quickly the minimum aquarium for this fish is a 500-gallon aquarium. Although some sources argue it can be kept in as little a tank as 125 gallons, when it achieves its adult size of two feet it is very unlikely to thrive, and will likely lead to premature death.

Its diet consists of invertebrates. In aquariums shrimp, squid, clams, octopus, scallops, and crab are all good choices of food.

References

External links 

 animal-world.com Page on queen triggerfish
 Aquarium Fish: Triggerfish
 

Balistidae
Fish of the Atlantic Ocean
Fish described in 1758
Taxa named by Carl Linnaeus